Niall Nathan Michael Ennis (born 20 May 1999) is an English professional footballer who plays as a forward for Plymouth Argyle.

He has represented England at under 16, 17, 18 and 19 levels.

Career
Born in Wolverhampton, Ennis is a youth product of hometown club Wolverhampton Wanderers. In November 2015 he signed a three-year professional contract to come into effect after his 17th birthday. He suffered a fibula fracture in January 2016 that kept him out of action until the summer.

He was part of Wolves' pre-season preparations for the 2016–17 campaign (scoring twice), but did not make a first-team appearance during the season proper after suffering another fibula fracture in November 2016.

On 26 July 2017, he moved on a season-long loan to League One side Shrewsbury Town. He made his senior debut for the club on 8 August in an EFL Cup first round defeat at Nottingham Forest, starting and playing 83 minutes of the 2–1 loss. On 5 September, it was revealed Ennis had suffered yet another long-term injury, this time to his knee, putting him out of action for an estimated four to six months.

On 5 February 2019, Ennis made his first-team début for Wolverhampton Wanderers in an FA Cup fourth round replay against his former team Shrewsbury. He replaced Ivan Cavaleiro as an 88th-minute substitute in the 3–2 win at Molineux.

On 2 August 2019, Ennis signed a new contract to remain linked to Wolves until 2022. He was then loaned back to League One for the season, this time to Doncaster Rovers alongside Cameron John. On 24 August, he scored his first senior goal, a 25-yard strike to open a 2–1 home win over Lincoln City.

On 16 October 2020, he joined Burton Albion on a season-long loan deal. However, on 5 January 2021, he was recalled by Wolverhampton.

On 18 January 2021, Ennis joined League One side Plymouth Argyle on a permanent basis, for an undisclosed fee, signing a two-and-a-half year deal.

Career statistics

References

External links

England profile at The Football Association

1999 births
Living people
Footballers from Wolverhampton
English footballers
England youth international footballers
Association football forwards
Wolverhampton Wanderers F.C. players
Shrewsbury Town F.C. players
Doncaster Rovers F.C. players
Burton Albion F.C. players
English Football League players
Black British sportspeople
Plymouth Argyle F.C. players